The 1997–98 Iowa State Cyclones men's basketball team represents Iowa State University during the 1997–98 NCAA Division I men's basketball season. The Cyclones were coached by Tim Floyd, who was in his 4th season. They played their home games at Hilton Coliseum in Ames, Iowa and competed in the Big 12 Conference.

They finished the season 12–18, 5–11 in Big 12 play to finish in 11th place. They lost to Missouri in the first round of the Big 12 Conference tournament.

At the conclusion of the season head coach Tim Floyd accepted the same position with the Chicago Bulls of the NBA.

Previous season

The previous season was the Cyclones first year in the newly formed Big 12 Conference. The Big 12 conference was formed by the eight teams of the recently dissolved Big Eight Conference and was joined by Baylor, Texas, Texas A&M, and Texas Tech, all formally of the Southwest Conference which had dissolved following the 1995–1996 school year as well.

The Cyclones finished the season 22–9, 10–6 in Big 12 play to finish tied for third place. They defeated Texas Tech and lost to Kansas in the semifinals of the Big 12 Conference tournament. They received an at-large bid to the NCAA tournament and a #6 seed. In the tournament they defeated Illinois State and Cincinnati to reach the Sweet Sixteen where they lost to UCLA.

The Cyclones saw individual success with Dedric Willoughby being names All-American Second Team, NCAA Tournament All-Regional Team, and first team All-Big Eight.

Offseason departures

Presesaon

Head Coach Tim Floyd was able to sign McDonald's All-American Marcus Fizer.  Fizer was the first, and to date, only McDonald's All-American to sign with Iowa State. Floyd first started recruiting Fizer when he was coaching at New Orleans.

Floyd was also able to replenish the back-court with Junior College transfers Jerry Curry, Tim Stevens, and Delvin Washington.

Preseason Poll

Incoming Players

Roster

Schedule and results

|-
!colspan=12 style=""|Regular Season

|-

|-

|-

|-

|-

|-

|-

|-

|-

|-

|-

|-

|-

|-

|-

|-

|-

|-

|-

|-

|-

|-

|-

|-

|-

|-

|-

|-

|-
!colspan=12 style=""|Big 12 Tournament
|-

|-

Awards and honors

 All-Big 12 Selections

Marcus Fizer (Third Team)

 Academic All-Big 12

Paul Shirley (First Team)
Klay Edwards (Second Team)

Ralph A. Olsen Award

Marcus Fizer

 Big 12 Freshman of the Year

Marcus Fizer

 Big 12 Freshman of the Week

Marcus Fizer (January 4th)
Marcus Fizer (January 11th)
Marcus Fizer (February 23rd)
Marcus Fizer (March 1st)

References

Iowa State Cyclones men's basketball seasons
Iowa State
Iowa State Cyc
Iowa State Cyc